Clavatula mystica is a species of sea snail, a marine gastropod mollusk in the family Clavatulidae.

Description
The size of an adult shell varies between 18 mm and 47 mm.

Distribution
This species occurs in the Atlantic Ocean from the Western Sahara to Ghana; also off the Canary Islands, Ivory Coast and North Angola.

References

 Boyer F. & Hernández J.M., 2004: Variability and distribution of Clavatula mystica (Reeve, 1843) ; Iberus 22(1): 77-84

External links
 

mystica
Gastropods described in 1843